Dodanthale Raja Maha Vihara (also known as Sri Seneviratne Uposatha Raja Maha Vihara) is an historic Buddhist temple situated in Mawanella, Kegalle District, Sri Lanka. The temple has been formally recognised by the Government as an archaeological site in Sri Lanka. The designation was declared on 10 November 1978 under the government Gazette number 10.

History
The temple at Dodantale was first designed by chief Adikaram Molligoda to serve as a royal palace. It is said that the ground floor of this palace was intended to use as royal audience hall while the first floor as living quarters of royalty and the third for the tooth relic of Buddha. The location had natural protection from all sides, with hills to the north and south and a moat on the eastern and western sides. Prior to the third storey being constructed Molligoda converted the building to a Buddhist Vihara. The building was completed in 1832.

The ground floor of the vihara is used as a preaching hall, with two wooden staircases leading up to the second floor. The roof is tiled with Koku Ulu tiles.

Image house
The temple is well known for its image house, built in Tempita Vihara tradition.

There are three Buddha statues in the image house at the upper floor which is surrounded by a veranda. All the statues are curved out of timber. The inner walls and the ceiling of the image house are decorated with Kandyan period murals. Among them a portrait of the Kirti Sri Rajasinha (1747-1782) wearing the Kurulu Padakkama (Bird pendant) has been identified. Kurulu Padakkama is a jewel made for the Adikaram Molligoda which has a Sinhalese inscription on the reverse. Also an old wide-mouthed large earthen vessel called Pathra, used to hold water or to receive offerings from worshipers, has been preserved in the Vihara premises today.

References

External links
Dodantale Raja Maha Viharaya
Dodanthale Sri Seneviratnarama Purana Tampita Viharaya

Buddhist temples in Kegalle District
Archaeological protected monuments in Kegalle District